Jonathan Hernandez (born April 29, 1997) is an American football player who is currently a free agent.

Career

LA Galaxy II
On 6 May 2017, Hernandez signed with United Soccer League club LA Galaxy II.

Kitchee
On 29 March 2019, Hernandez joined Hong Kong Premier League club Kitchee.

Honours

Club
Kitchee
 Hong Kong FA Cup: 2018–19

References

External links

1997 births
Living people
American soccer players
LA Galaxy II players
Kitchee SC players
Hong Kong Premier League players
Association football midfielders
Soccer players from California
American expatriates in Hong Kong
American expatriate soccer players
USL Championship players
Expatriate footballers in Hong Kong
Sportspeople from Pasadena, California
Mt. SAC Mounties men's soccer players